Berberine is a quaternary ammonium salt from the protoberberine group of benzylisoquinoline alkaloids found in such plants as Berberis vulgaris (barberry), Berberis aristata (tree turmeric), Mahonia aquifolium (Oregon grape), Hydrastis canadensis (goldenseal), Xanthorhiza simplicissima (yellowroot), Phellodendron amurense (Amur cork tree), Coptis chinensis (Chinese goldthread), Tinospora cordifolia, Argemone mexicana (prickly poppy), and Eschscholzia californica (Californian poppy). Berberine is usually found in the roots, rhizomes, stems, and bark.

Due to its yellow color, Berberis species were used to dye wool, leather, and wood. Under ultraviolet light, berberine shows a strong yellow fluorescence, making it useful in histology for staining heparin in mast cells. As a natural dye, berberine has a color index of 75160.

Research and adverse effects

The safety of using berberine for any condition is not adequately defined by high-quality clinical research. 

It has a high potential to cause adverse effects, including adverse interactions with prescription drugs, reducing the intended effect of established therapies. Berberine weakly inhibits the CYP2D6 and CYP3A4 enzymes which are involved in metabolism of endogenous substances and xenobiotics, including many prescription drugs.

It is particularly unsafe for use in newborns and infants.

Biosynthesis 

The alkaloid berberine has a tetracyclic skeleton derived from a benzyltetrahydroisoquinoline system with the incorporation of an extra carbon atom as a bridge. Formation of the berberine bridge is rationalized as an oxidative process in which the N-methyl group, supplied by S-adenosyl methionine (SAM), is oxidized to an iminium ion, and a cyclization to the aromatic ring occurs by virtue of the phenolic group.

Reticuline is the immediate precursor of protoberberine alkaloids in plants. Berberine is an alkaloid derived from tyrosine. L-DOPA and 4-hydroxypyruvic acid both come from L-tyrosine. Although two tyrosine molecules are used in the biosynthetic pathway, only the phenethylamine fragment of the tetrahydroisoquinoline ring system is formed via DOPA, the remaining carbon atoms come from tyrosine via 4-hydroxyphenylacetaldehyde. L-DOPA loses carbon dioxide to form dopamine 1. Likewise, 4-hydroxypyruvic acid also loses carbon dioxide to form 4-hydroxyphenylacetaldehyde 2. Dopamine 1 then reacts with 4-hydroxy-phenylacetaldehyde 2 to form (S)-norcoclaurine 3 in a reaction similar to the Mannich reaction. After oxidation and methylation by SAM, (S)-reticuline 4 is formed. (S)-reticuline serves as a pivotal intermediate to other alkaloids. Oxidation of the tertiary amine then occurs and an iminium ion is formed 5. In a Mannich-like reaction the ortho position to the phenol is nucleophilic, and electrons are pushed to form 6. Product 6 then undergoes keto–enol tautomerism to form (S)-scoulerine, which is then methylated by SAM to form (S)-tetrahydrocolumbamine 7. Product 7 is then oxidized to form the methylenedioxy ring from the ortho-methoxyphenol, via an O2-, NADPH- and cytochrome P450-dependent enzyme, giving (S)-canadine 8. (S)-canadine is then oxidized to give the quaternary isoquinolinium system of berberine. This happens in two separate oxidation steps, both requiring molecular oxygen, with H2O2 and H2O produced in the successive processes.

References 

Aromatase inhibitors
Benzodioxoles
CYP2D6 inhibitors
CYP3A4 inhibitors
DNA-binding substances
Benzylisoquinoline alkaloids
Nitrogen heterocycles
Quaternary ammonium compounds